Alison Cornyn is a Brooklyn-based interdisciplinary artist, activist and educator. She is a founding partner and the Creative Director of Picture Projects Studio Cornyn is also the Creative Director of the Guantanamo Public Memory Project and States of Incarceration. She was a TED Resident in 2017 and gave a TED Talk that was released in November 2017. In addition, Cornyn teaches at SVA, in the Design for Social Innovation MA program. She has also taught at Parsons The New School's Humanities Action Lab and New York University's interactive Telecommunications Program. Her work revolves around combining traditional media and modern technology to foster dialogue concerning social justice issues, especially around the criminal justice system. She and her partner, Gilles Peress, live in Brooklyn with their three children.

Over the course of her career, Cornyn has created many exhibitions, web platforms, and physical installations that focus on modern social justice issues. Cornyn has received multiple grants and awards for her work in social justice and media, including a Peabody Award.

Education
Cornyn received her bachelor's in Fine Arts and Art History at Connecticut College. She also received a Master of Fine Arts degree at Hunter College as well as a Master of Professional Studies at NYU's Tisch School of the Arts in the Interactive Telecommunications Program (ITP). She then went on to complete the Whitney Museum's Independent Study Program (ISP) in New York City.

Exhibitions and web platforms
Cornyn's projects have been showcased at exhibitions around the world as well as on the web. Her projects include Incorrigibles, the Sonic Memorial Project, and 360 Degrees- Perspectives on the U.S. Criminal Justice System,, which is a web documentary that examines incarceration from multiple perspectives. Another one of her works is The Sand Counting Lab, which was a large-scale project focused on counting over two million grains of sand in an effort to represent the number of people incarcerated in the United States. Incorrigibles is a long-term project about the history of young women's incarceration. Other art projects by Cornyn can be seen on the artist's website.

Awards and grants
Cornyn has received several awards for her work. Among these was the first Peabody Award to go to a web documentary, the 62nd Annual Peabody Award. She has also been awarded with the Gracie Allen Award for Women in Media and a Webby Award for net.art.

Cornyn's has also received several grants and fellowships over the course of her career. Among these was a National Endowment for the Humanities grant, a grant from the Creative Capital Foundation, a fellowship from the New York Foundation for the Arts and grants from the New York State Council on the Arts (NYSCA). She was a grant recipient in the inaugural round of New York City's groundbreaking "Made in NY" Women's Film, TV & Theatre Fund from the Mayor's Office of Film, Theatre & Broadcasting.

References

External links
 Picture Projects Inc. 
 Guantanamo Public Memory Project 
 The Prison Public Memory Project 
 Incorrigibles 
 Cornyn's TED Talk 
 States of Incarceration 
 The Sonic Memorial Project
 Alison Cornyn artist website

Year of birth missing (living people)
Living people
American artists
Connecticut College alumni
Hunter College alumni
Tisch School of the Arts alumni
American criminologists
American women criminologists